WMPA (93.1 FM) is a radio station operating on 93.1 MHz. It is licensed to Ferrysburg, Michigan. It airs a Christian radio format, featuring Christian preaching, lessons, music and assorted educational programming. Programming is provided by Strong Tower Radio, under an agreement with the company that owns WGHN-FM, another Grand Haven, MI-based radio station.

History
On May 25, 2018 WMPA changed their format from country to classic rock, branded as "Classic Rock 93.1". Programming included the "Classic Rock Cafe" weekdays from Noon to 1 and "In The Basement With Jesse Bruce" weekdays 3 to 7pm. WMPA also carried "Nights With Alice Cooper," "Flashback" and "In Concert.". In March 2022, it was indicated that Strong Tower Radio would be providing the programming going forward; this transition finalized on June 10, 2022.

On November 21, 2022 WMPA went silent due to it being evicted from its tower site by the city of Grand Haven.

Previous logo

References

External links

2012 establishments in Michigan
Ottawa County, Michigan
Radio stations established in 2012
MPA